The Golden State Mutual Life Insurance Building was built in 1928 and for many years housed one of Los Angeles's most successful African American-owned businesses, the Golden State Mutual Life Insurance Company. The building is located in the heart of the city's Central Avenue commercial district that was a center of the jazz world in the 1930s and 1940s. The two-story building was designed by architect James H. Garrott and constructed by Louis Blodgett (both African Americans) in the Mission Revival style. The company occupied the second floor, while the first floor was rented out to local merchants.  The noted Dunbar Hotel is located on the next block to the north.

In 1949, the Golden State Mutual Life Insurance Company moved to its new headquarters at 1999 West Adams, now also an historic building. The structure was later converted into a child development center known as the Dunbar Child Development Center. In 1998, the building was listed on the National Register of Historic Places.

See also
 List of Registered Historic Places in Los Angeles
 List of Los Angeles Historic-Cultural Monuments in South Los Angeles
 Central Avenue

Notes

External links
Blackartdepot.com: "Save the Golden State Mutual Life Insurance Company's Collection of African American Art" — Woodruff Alston murals.

Office buildings in Los Angeles
Insurance company headquarters in the United States
African-American historic places
African-American history in Los Angeles
South Los Angeles
Commercial buildings on the National Register of Historic Places in Los Angeles
Los Angeles Historic-Cultural Monuments
Commercial buildings completed in 1928
1928 establishments in California
1920s architecture in the United States